Kyunkii Tum Hi Ho is an Indian Hindi-language romance drama television series. Produced by Amar Upadhyay and Suhail Zaidi under the banner of Hawk Eye Vision, it stars Amar Upadhyay, Priyanka Dhawale and Harsh Nagar. It premiered on 12 December 2022 on Shemaroo Umang.

Plot

A young, beautiful and carefree woman, Kavya Sharma loves her childhood friend, Ayushmaan Bhargav and believes they are made for each other. However, a wealthy individual, Karanpratap Singh enters her life and brings about a dilemma.

Cast
 Amar Upadhyay as Karanpratap Singh (Dead)
 Priyanka Dhavale as Kavya Karanpratap Singh 
 Harsh Nagar as Ayushmaan Bhargav
 Saptrishi Ghosh as Om Sharma
 Tasneem Ali as Parvati Om Sharma
 Rohit Agarwal as Prithvi Sharma
 Yatee Upadhyay as Ishika
 Shahmir Khan as Rocky
 Keerti Adharkar as Bhavanipratap Singh
 Shiva Rindani as Bhanupratap Singh
 Deepali Saini as Menaka Bhanupratap Singh

Production 
The series was announced in 2022 by Shemaroo Umang, starring Harsh Nagar, Priyanka Dhawale and Amar Upadhyay.  The promos featuring the leads were released in December 2022.

References

External links
 
 
 Kyunkii Tum Hi Ho on ShemarooMe

Hindi-language television shows
Indian drama television series